Ann Hughes (born September 28, 1943) is an American politician.

Born in Ogdensburg, New York, Hughes received her bachelor's degree in biology from Wells College in 1965. Hughes also went to McHenry County College and lived in Woodstock, Illinois. In 1977, Hughes served on the Woodstock School Board. She then served on the McHenry County Board in 1980 and was chair of the board. Hughes was a Republican. Hughes served in the Illinois House of Representatives from 1993 until her resignation from the Illinois General Assembly on June 30, 1997.

Notes

1943 births
Living people
People from Ogdensburg, New York
People from Woodstock, Illinois
Wells College alumni
Women state legislators in Illinois
School board members in Illinois
County commissioners in Illinois
Republican Party members of the Illinois House of Representatives
21st-century American women